Yordan is a given name and less often a surname. Notable people with the name include:

Surname 
Philip Yordan (1914–2003), American screenwriter

Given name 
Yordan Álvarez (born 1997), Cuban baseball player
Yordan Angelov (born 1953), Bulgarian volleyball player
Yordan Bikov (born 1950), Bulgarian weightlifter
Yordan Etov (born 1989), Bulgarian football player
Yordan Frometa, Cuban amateur featherweight boxer
Yordan Gospodinov (born 1978), Bulgarian football player
Yordan Hadzhikonstantinov-Dzhinot (1818–1882), Bulgarian teacher, publicist and figure in the Bulgarian National Revival
Yordan Ilinov (born 1985), Bulgarian sprinter
Yordan Letchkov (born 1967), Bulgarian footballer, and mayor of Sliven
Yordan Miliev (born 1987), Bulgarian football player
Yordan Minev (born 1980), Bulgarian football player
Yordan Mitkov (born 1956), Bulgarian weightlifter
Yordan Parushev (born 1958), Bulgarian artist
Yordan Penev (born 1988), Bulgarian football player
Yordan Petkov (born 1976), Bulgarian football player
Yordan Piperkata (1870–1903), Macedonian Bulgarian revolutionary, member of IMARO
Yordan Radichkov (1929–2004), Bulgarian writer and playwright
 Yordan Todorov (footballer, born July 1981), Bulgarian football player
 Yordan Todorov (footballer, born November 1981), Bulgarian football player
 Yordan Todorov (footballer, born 1999), Bulgarian football player
Yordan Varbanov (born 1980), Bulgarian football player
Yordan Yanev (born 1954), Bulgarian long jumper
 Yordan Yordanov (disambiguation), various people
Yordan Yovkov (1880–1937), Bulgarian writer
Yordan Yurukov (born 1983), Bulgarian football player